The 2016 LSU Tigers football team represented Louisiana State University in the 2016 NCAA Division I FBS football season. The Tigers play their home games at Tiger Stadium in Baton Rouge, Louisiana, and compete in the Western Division of the Southeastern Conference (SEC). They were led by 12th year head coach Les Miles for the first four games of the year before he was fired on September 25 along with offensive coordinator Cam Cameron. Miles was replaced by interim head coach Ed Orgeron, who was later promoted to head coach on November 26, 2016. They finished the season 8–4, 5–3 in SEC play to finish in a tie for second place in the Western Division. They were invited to the Citrus Bowl where they defeated Louisville.

Schedule
LSU announced its 2016 football schedule on October 29, 2015. Because of scheduling issues, the 2016 schedule consisted of seven home, three away, and one neutral site games in the regular season. The Tigers were to host SEC foes Alabama, Mississippi State, Missouri, and Ole Miss, and travel to Arkansas, Auburn, Florida, and Texas A&M.

The Tigers competed against the Missouri Tigers for the first time since the 1978 Liberty Bowl. The team traveled to Green Bay, Wisconsin to compete against Wisconsin from the Big Ten Conference at Lambeau Field. LSU hosted two non–conference games against Jacksonville State from the Ohio Valley Conference and Southern Miss from Conference USA. LSU was scheduled to play South Alabama from the Sun Belt Conference, but it was canceled after the Florida game was rescheduled due to Hurricane Matthew.

The October 8 game between LSU and Florida was postponed in advance of the arrival of Hurricane Matthew. The game was eventually rescheduled for November 19 at Tiger Stadium, replacing the previously scheduled game against South Alabama.

Roster

Rankings

Season summary

vs. Wisconsin

References

LSU
LSU Tigers football seasons
Citrus Bowl champion seasons
LSU Tigers football